Saint Giri Senior Secondary School is an educational facility located in New Delhi, India. The Saint Giri Group of Schools was established in 1992 up to secondary level, Thereafter Senior secondary was established in 1995. The organization is affiliated with the Goswami Vidyapeeth Society and was founded by Shri H.V Giri.

Branches 
, there are seven branches of the school, with six in New Delhi and one in Indore, Madhya Pradesh. The schools located in Delhi include Rohini, Okhla, Sarita Vihar, Jamia Nagar, Chanakyapuri, and Patel Nagar.

See also
Education in India
Education in Delhi
List of schools in Delhi
 CBSE

References

External links 
 

High schools and secondary schools in Delhi